Mount Deception may refer to:
 Mount Deception (Alaska), a peak of the Alaska Range southeast of Mount McKinley (Denali)
 Mount Deception (Washington) in the Olympic Mountains
 Mount Deception (New Hampshire), a mountain in the Dartmouth Range